Players and pairs who neither have high enough rankings nor receive wild cards may participate in a qualifying tournament held one week before the annual Wimbledon Tennis Championships. This article concerns the qualifying tournament for women's doubles.

Seeds

  Stéphanie Foretz Gacon /  Eva Hrdinová (qualified)
  Séverine Beltrame /  Laura Thorpe (first round)
  Nina Bratchikova /  Julia Cohen (first round)
  Caroline Garcia /  Andreja Klepač (first round)
  Raluca Olaru /  Olga Savchuk (qualified)
  Gabriela Dabrowski /  Sharon Fichman (first round)
  Mariana Duque Mariño /  Teliana Pereira (qualifying competition)
  Eleni Daniilidou /  CoCo Vandeweghe (withdrew)

Qualifiers

  Stéphanie Foretz Gacon /  Eva Hrdinová
  María Irigoyen /  Paula Ormaechea
  Raluca Olaru /  Olga Savchuk
  Valeriya Solovyeva /  Maryna Zanevska

Qualifying draw

First qualifier

Second qualifier

Third qualifier

Fourth qualifier

External links

2013 Wimbledon Championships on WTAtennis.com
2013 Wimbledon Championships – Women's draws and results at the International Tennis Federation

Women's Doubles Qualifying
Wimbledon Championship by year – Women's doubles qualifying
Wimbledon Championships